Boyce Ridge is a 4.4-mile (7-km) ridge that extends westward from Taylor Ledge to the head of Nimitz Glacier in Sentinel Range, Ellsworth Mountains in Antarctica. The ridge adjoins the north flank of lower Branscomb Glacier.

The feature was named by the Advisory Committee on Antarctic Names (US-ACAN) in 2006 after Joseph Boyce, a retired NASA manager who was instrumental in facilitating the U.S. meteorite program in partnership with NSF and the Smithsonian Institution; a member of the ANSMET teams in the 2004–05, 2008–09, and 2012–13 field seasons.

In 1997, French mountaineer, Jean-Marc Gryzka, was killed in a climbing accident on Boyce Ridge. While descending Boyce Ridge, the sleds used by Gryzka and his climbing partner Bernard Virelaude unexpectedly slipped and dragged them down the slope.  They plummeted over a steep drop on the ridge where at its bottom, Gryzka hit his head on a rock, killing him instantly.  Virelaude landed in snow and was uninjured (1) .

Location
US mapping in 1961, updated in 1988.

Maps
 Vinson Massif.  Scale 1:250 000 topographic map.  Reston, Virginia: US Geological Survey, 1988.
 Antarctic Digital Database (ADD). Scale 1:250000 topographic map of Antarctica. Scientific Committee on Antarctic Research (SCAR). Since 1993, regularly updated.

References
 (1)  Mountaineering in Antarctic: Ellsworth Mountains Climbing in the Frozen South.  Damien Gildea 2010, Editions Nevicata, Bruxelles, France.

 Boyce Ridge. SCAR Composite Gazetteer of Antarctica.

Ellsworth Mountains
Ridges of Ellsworth Land